Terken Khatun was the Empress of the Khwarazmian Empire by marriage to Shah Ala al-Din Tekish, and the mother and de facto co-ruler of Muhammad II of the Khwarazmian Empire.

Background
Terken Khatun was the Qipchaq khan's daughter. She was from either the Qangli or the Bayandur tribe of the Kimek. According to Jalal al-Din Mangburni's biographer Shihab al-Din Muhammad al-Nasawi, the majority of her son Ala al-Din Muhammad's top commanders were from Terken Khatun's tribe, and the need to attach them to his side was one reason why the Shah lent so heavily on his mother for advice.

De facto co-ruler and Reign as Potential ruler
After the death of her husband, 'Ala' al-Din Tekish (1172-1200), she so dominated the court of their son, 'Ala' al-Din Muhammad II (1200–20), and quarreled so bitterly with his heir by another wife, Jalal al-Din, that she may have contributed to the impotence of the Khwarazmian Empire in the face of the Mongol onslaught. She had a separate Diwan and separate palace and the orders of the Sultan were not considered to be effective without her signature. The Shah ruled the heterogeneous peoples without mercy. In face of Mongol attacks, Khwarazmian empire, with a combined army of 400,000, simply collapsed. Khwarazmshah Muhammed had retreated to Samarkand towards the end of his domination and he had to leave the capital city of Gurgenç (Köneürgenç, present-day Turkmenistan) to her.

Mongol invasion  

In 1219, Genghis Khan invaded Khwarazm. Many large and prosperous cities: Otrar, Khujand, Bukhara, Samarkand, Merv, Nishapur and others were razed and their inhabitants killed. Muhammad died after fleeing in 1220 or a year after on a deserted island in the Caspian sea. She fled with the harem and the children of Khwarazmshah, took the royal treasury, and drowned 26 hostages, sons of different conquered rulers. She passed through the Karakum and took refuge in the Ilal fortress, but the Mongols captured the fortress soon afterwards. She and all the people were captured. The sons of the Shah were killed, his women and daughters were distributed to the sons and associates of Genghis Khan.

Relations with Jalal al-Din 
Relationship between Turkan Hatun and her grandson, the son of Muhammad, Jalal al-Din, apparently was not good. When she was told to escape from the invading Mongols, she said:

Death 
She died in poverty somewhere on the territory of present-day Mongolia, in 1233.

References

External links
 https://iranicaonline.org/articles/terken-katun

12th-century women
13th-century women rulers
12th-century Iranian people
13th-century Iranian people
Anushtegin dynasty